USS Carpellotti has been the name of more than one United States Navy ship, and may refer to:

 , a destroyer escort cancelled during construction in 1944
 , a destroyer escort converted during construction into the fast transport , in commission from 1945 to 1958

United States Navy ship names